Coldseed is a multinational heavy metal band led by Swedish vocalist Björn Strid of Soilwork and Terror 2000. The five other members are German drummer Thomen Stauch (Savage Circus), his countrymen bassist Oliver Holzwarth (Blind Guardian) and keyboardist Michael Schüren (Blind Guardian), as well as Swedish guitarist Thorsten Praest and Spaniard Gonzalo Alfageme López.

The band was formed as a side project in 2004. Although they are an active band, they have released only one album. Their music is classified as gothic metal, groove metal and industrial metal. AllMusic describes the band's sound as an "odd mix of hard rock, nu-metal and gothic alt-rock".

Their debut album, Completion Makes the Tragedy, was released by Nuclear Blast in 2006.

References

External links
Completion Makes the Tragedy album review – metal.de
Biography on laut.de

German gothic metal musical groups
Groove metal musical groups
Musical groups established in 2004